The United States National Chemistry Olympiad (or USNCO) is a contest held by the American Chemical Society (ACS) used to select the four-student team that represents the United States at the International Chemistry Olympiad (IChO).

Each local ACS section selects eight students (or more for larger ACS sections) to take the USNCO National Exam. To qualify for the national exam, students must first take the local exam. Approximately 16,000 U.S. students sit for the local exam each year. More than 1000 students qualify to take the National Exam annually.

Exam format 

The National Exam consists of three parts.

Multiple choice 

The first part contains 60 multiple-choice questions. Each question has four answer choices. The questions are loosely grouped into 10 sets of 6 items; each set corresponds to a different chemistry topic. Typically, the topics are, in order, descriptive chemistry/laboratory techniques, stoichiometry, gases/liquids/solids, thermodynamics, kinetics, equilibrium, electrochemistry, electronic structure/periodic trends, bonding theories, and organic chemistry. There is no penalty for guessing; a student's score is equal to the number of questions answered correctly. One and a half hours (90 minutes) are allotted for this first part.

Free response 

The second part contains 8 free response questions. Complete written explanations and calculations are required for full credit on a question, and partial credit is awarded. More thorough knowledge of basic theories is required, and often there are questions on less-emphasized portions of normal high school chemistry curricula, such as organic chemistry and coordination chemistry. One hour and 45 minutes (105 minutes) are allowed for this section.

Lab practical 

Beginning in 1994, the lab practical was added to the National Exam. It contains two tasks to be performed by each student with only the specified materials, and students are expected to describe their procedures and organize their findings. Past tasks have included chromatography, titration and qualitative analysis, and 90 minutes are allotted to complete the two experiments.

USNCO Study Camp and other recognition 

The top 20 scorers on the USNCO National Exam are invited to participate in the two-week USNCO Study Camp at the United States Air Force Academy in Colorado Springs, Colorado. At the camp, the students are tested (both free response and lab testing), and the top four students are selected to comprise the U.S. IChO team.  Two alternates are also selected, although no alternate has ever actually been called up for duty.

In addition, the top 50 students are recognized as achieving "High Honors", and the top 150 students earn "Honors" designation.

Scope of the test as compared to the IChO 

The purpose of the USNCO is to stimulate all young people to achieve excellence in chemistry. Therefore, the focus of the exam is not necessarily to select the top twenty students, and instead to present a wide selection of basic questions. Therefore, the scope of the USNCO is different than the scope of what would be expected at the training camp or IChO.

See also 
 International Chemistry Olympiad
 Other International Science Olympiads

References

External links 
 The American Chemical Society Website
 The ACS website for the USNCO

American Chemical Society
Youth science
Student quiz competitions
Chemistry competitions
Science events in the United States
Education competitions in the United States
Annual events in Colorado